Patrizia Piovesan Silva is a Venezuelan fencer. She won the silver medal in the women's épée event at the 2019 Pan American Games held in Lima, Peru. She also won the bronze medal in the women's team épée event.

References

External links 
 

Living people
Year of birth missing (living people)
Place of birth missing (living people)
Venezuelan female épée fencers
Pan American Games silver medalists for Venezuela
Pan American Games bronze medalists for Venezuela
Pan American Games medalists in fencing
Fencers at the 2019 Pan American Games
Medalists at the 2019 Pan American Games
21st-century Venezuelan women